Airtel Uganda Limited is a mobile communications and information technology services provider in Uganda. The company also offers mobile funds transfer and banking services known as Airtel Payments Bank. Airtel Uganda Limited is a subsidiary of Airtel Africa PLC.

Location
The headquarters of Airtel Uganda are located in Airtel Towers, along Clement Hill Road, in the Central Division of Kampala, the county's capital and largest city. The coordinates of the headquarters are 0°19'14.0"N, 32°35'18.0"E (Latitude:0.320556; Longitude:32.588333).

History
Airtel entered the Uganda Market on June 8, 2010 when Bharti Airtel acquired 16 Zain Africa operations. In 2013, Airtel fully acquired Warid Telecom Uganda in the first ever in-country acquisition in the telecommunications sector. With this, Airtel further consolidated its position as the second largest mobile operator in Uganda with a combined customer base of over 7.4 million and market share of over 39% cementing its position as the number 2 mobile telephone network, behind market leader MTN Uganda.

In 2018, Airtel hit the 10 million customer mark. This milestone cemented Airtel’s position as the fastest growing telecom in Uganda. In January 2019, Airtel Uganda achieved 100% 4G LTE across all its sites in Uganda, translating the national broadband policy into reality. The telco owns in excess of 2,000 masts in Uganda, as of April 2020.

Overview 
Airtel Uganda, is one of the leading telecommunication service providers in Uganda, offering communication products and services; 2G, 3G and 4G wireless voice, data services and mobile commerce through Airtel Money. As of March 2021, the Uganda Communications Commission (UCC), estimated the number of subscribers to Airtel Uganda at 10 million out of the 28.3 million mobile network subscribers in the country. This translates into a 35.3 percent market share.

Airtel Money 
Airtel Uganda launched Mobile Commerce in 2012. Currently the Airtel Money platform is a primary contributor to financial inclusion and a key point for financial inclusion with over 5 million customers as at end of March 31, 2019.

Investment 
Airtel is a long term investor with a single largest foreign direct investment from India to Uganda. The company is among the leading tax payers in Uganda.

In 2019, Airtel was recognized as Uganda’s biggest taxpayer for compliance in remitting taxes to Uganda Revenue Authority. Airtel Uganda paid taxes worth UGX136 billion (approx. US$38 million), in the financial year 2018/19 winning the Excel Award.

Infrastructure investment 
Airtel invests in local ICT and telecom infrastructure; 2,000 sites and over 3,900 kilo meters of fiber across Uganda covering 95.9%, core and transmission networks and mobile financial services platform.

Governance
Manoj Murali is Managing Director of Airtel Uganda since October 2020.  He Replaced VG Somasekhar who until recently was the MD Airtel Uganda. 
Before Joining Airtel Uganda, Manoj handled different roles and worked across geographies in India, the corporate and the international operations of Sri Lanka, Seychelles, and the Channel Islands. His most recent assignment was CEO of Tamil Nadu and Kerala. Prior to this, he held other roles including Chief Operating (Executive) Officer in Rajasthan and Business head (Chief Operating Officer) in Andhra Pradesh, among other positions within the system,”.

People
99% of Airtel staff are Ugandan, with over 40% being women.

License renewal
In December 2020, print media reported that Airtel Uganda had paid US$74.6 million to the Uganda government in exchange for a 20-year National Telecom Operator's License. The basic license cost US$63.2 million and Value Added Tax (VAT) came to US$11.4 million. As a condition for the license, that is effective on 1 July 2020, the telco has until 1 July 2025 to extend coverage of both voice and data to at least 90 percent of Uganda's geographical territory.

In January 2022, The EastAfrican reported that the license payment made in December 2020 was for the ten years from July 2020 to June 2030. Another estimated US$77.78 million was owed to the Uganda Government for the period from July 2030 until June 2040.

Listing of shares
It is expected that Airtel Uganda is going to list at least 20 percent of its shares of stock on the Uganda Securities Exchange in 2022, to comply with Ugandan laws and regulations. In April 2022, the telco requested for a one year extension to the original listing deadline of December 2022.

See also
 List of mobile network operators in Uganda

References

External links
  Website of Airtel Uganda
Internet key to growth, Airtel boss As of 13 June 2018.

Bharti Airtel
Kampala Central Division
Telecommunications companies established in 1995
Mobile phone companies of Uganda
1995 establishments in Uganda
Telecommunications companies of Uganda
Companies based in Kampala